Yên Phong may refer to several places in Vietnam, including:

Yên Phong District, a rural district of Bắc Ninh Province
Yên Phong, Bắc Kạn, a rural commune of Chợ Đồn District
Yên Phong, Hà Giang, a rural commune of Bắc Mê District
Yên Phong, Nam Định, a rural commune of Ý Yên District
Yên Phong, Ninh Bình, a rural commune of Yên Mô District
Yên Phong, Thanh Hóa, a rural commune of Yên Định District